Divji Potok (also Vildpoh,  or Wildbach) is a former settlement in the Municipality of Dolenjske Toplice in southern Slovenia. The area is part of the traditional region of Lower Carniola and is now included in the Southeast Slovenia Statistical Region. Its territory is now part of the village of Nova Gora.

History
Divji Potok was a Gottschee German village. Before the Second World War it had two houses and 14 residents. The original inhabitants were expelled in the fall of 1941, and the village was burned by Italian troops in the summer of 1942 during the Rog Offensive. The foundations of two sawmills that stood at the site are still visible.

References

External links
 Divji Potok on Geopedia
Pre–World War II List of oeconyms and family names in Divji Potok

Former populated places in the Municipality of Dolenjske Toplice